Eat the Rich: A Treatise on Economics is a 1998 book by P. J. O'Rourke which explains economics in a humorous way. Its chapters include Good Capitalism (United States), Bad Capitalism (Albania), Good socialism (Sweden), Bad socialism (Cuba), and an intermission on "Economics 101", teaching facts that your economics professor didn't tell you, including the "ten less basic rules of economics". Subsequent chapters are on How to make everything out of nothing (Hong Kong), How to make nothing out of everything (Tanzania), How (or how not) to reform (maybe) an economy (if there is one) (Russia) and Eat the rich, the last an encomium to capitalism.

O'Rourke uses wit and an entire lack of mathematics (except in rare glances for parody) to claim that economics is something we all do every day, and only economists seem to find it difficult. He states, for example, that he has read The Wealth of Nations without finding any mathematics in it at all.

In the Acknowledgements, O'Rourke admits to stealing the title which he first saw on a Lebanese Shi'ite Militia T-shirt in the mid 80's. He also remembers later hearing its appropriation in an Aerosmith song and acknowledges its use in the Motörhead song, "Eat the Rich".

References

Further reading

External links 
Podcast of PJ O'Rourke talking about Eat the Rich on the BBC's World Book Club

Presentation by O'Rourke on Eat the Rich, September 15, 1998, C-SPAN
Booknotes interview with O'Rourke on Each the Rich, January 3, 1999, C-SPAN

1998 non-fiction books
Economics books
Comedy books
Atlantic Monthly Press books